The Pan County west railway or Panxi railway, is a single-track electrified railroad in Southwest China between Zhanyi County in eastern Yunnan province and Baiguo Township in Pan County in western Guizhou province. The line's name is derived from the fact that the railway from Hongguo to Baiguo, runs along the western border of Pan County. The Panxi line was electrified in 2001 and permits trains from Chengdu to reach the seaport at Fangchenggang by following the Neijiang–Kunming railway, Liupanshui–Baiguo railway, Panxi and Weishe–Hongguo railway lines to the Nanning–Kunming railway at Weishe, saving  from traveling via the Chengdu–Kunming railway to the Nankun line at Kunming. Notable stations along route include Zhanyi, Fucheng County, Hongguo Township and Baiguo Township.

Rail connections
 Zhanyi: Shanghai–Kunming railway
Hongguo: Weishe–Hongguo railway
Baiguo: Liupanshui–Baiguo railway

See also

 List of railways in China

References

Railway lines in China
Rail transport in Guizhou
Rail transport in Yunnan